Marc Edwards (born 11 November 1980) is a Welsh-Chinese Television Presenter, formerly on China Central Television, France 24, London Live and Eurosport, and now on BBC News and BBC World News. He currently presents Sport Today. He was the male stadium announcer in French and English for the opening and closing ceremonies for the 2012 Summer Olympics.

Early life
Edwards was born in Paris to a Welsh father and a Malaysian Chinese mother, and is fluent in French, Mandarin and English. He lived the first seven years of his life in Paris. He has one brother, Gareth who had also briefly hosted Travelogue.

Education
Edwards was educated at two independent schools: at Prestfelde School in Shrewsbury, followed by Radley College, a boarding school for boys, from 1993 to 1999, near the village of Radley in Oxfordshire, England. He read Modern Languages and Business at the University of Durham. While studying for a degree in Business, Italian and French he hosted his own show on the university radio station, Purple FM.

Life and career
Edwards worked in London and Paris before moving to China. He was hired in 2007 by China Central Television’s international-language channel CCTV News, where he hosted their flagship travel programme, Travelogue.

Edwards' first feature was a three-part series in conjunction with National Geographic’s Trends Traveler magazine. Here he travelled by car along the fabled Tea and Horse Trail, from Lijiang in Yunnan to Lhasa in Tibet. Episode 2 of the series won the award for best documentary at the annual CCTV awards 2008.

Edwards hosted Travelogue’s Being Beijing series and mini-series which aired throughout the Beijing Olympics in 2008 highlighting the best things to do, see and eat in the city for those attending the event. In 2009, Edwards hosted CCTV International's first ever travel show in Taiwan, touring the island for three weeks. The five-part series was the first major travel programme filmed between the mainland and Taiwan.

In 2010, Edwards was chosen to host Travelogue’s Shanghai Shanghai series highlighting all there is to do in the city to help the people attending the World Expo in Shanghai. In the series he also presented a two-part comprehensive guide to all the entertainment at the event. The series aired throughout the Expo 2010. 2010 also saw Edwards present the Miss World Bikini Finals for CCTV News. The competition held annually in Beihai formed part of Travelogue's guide to the seaside resort.

Edwards presented the Technology Show, Tech 24, on France's international news channel, France 24

Edwards was the male stadium announcer in English and French for the London 2012 Olympic Games Opening Ceremony directed by Danny Boyle (Along with Layla Anna-Lee, the Female voice). He was also the male stadium announcer for the London 2012 Olympic Games Closing Ceremony (Along with Trish Bertram, the Female voice).

In 2013, after working for French satellite channel France 24 and Eurosport, Edwards joined the new local Freeview channel London Live. In 2014, he joined BBC Sport as a sports presenter on Sport Today, on the BBC World News channel.

Series
 Series 5 – Taiwan
 Tea and Horse Trail
 Opening and Closing Ceremony Stadium Announcer – London 2012 Olympic Games
 Opening and Closing Ceremony Stadium Announcer – London 2012 Paralympic Games
 Olympic presenter for the London 2012 Fencing

References

External links 
 Marc Edwards Bio
 Marc Edwards Blog

1980 births
Living people
French emigrants to the United Kingdom
Welsh television presenters
Welsh people of Chinese descent
British people of Malaysian descent
Chinese television presenters
Chinese people of Welsh descent
Chinese people of Malaysian descent
Alumni of Durham University
People educated at Radley College